The 2014 German Figure Skating Championships was held on December 14–15, 2013 at the Erika-Hess-Eisstadion in Berlin. Medals were awarded in the disciplines of men's singles, ladies' singles, pair skating, and ice dancing on the senior, junior, and novice levels. The results were among the criteria used to choose the German teams to the 2014 Winter Olympics, 2014 World Championships, and 2014 European Championships.

Medalists

Senior

Junior

Senior results

Men

Ladies

Pairs
Annabelle Prölß / Ruben Blommaert and Shari Koch / Christian Nüchtern withdrew from the event.

Ice dancing

Lower levels
The junior, youth, and novice competitions were held on January 9–12, 2014 at the Eissportzentrum in Oberstdorf.

International team selections

Winter Olympics
Skaters nominated for the 2014 Winter Olympics:

World Championships
Skaters nominated for the 2014 World Championships:

European Championships
Skaters nominated for the 2014 European Championships:

World Junior Championships
Skaters nominated for the 2014 World Junior Championships:

References

External links
 2014 German Championships: Senior results at the Deutsche Eislauf Union
 2014 German Championships: Junior, youth, and novice results at the Deutsche Eislauf Union

German Championships
German Figure Skating Championships
Figure Skating Championships